, is an IT and music journalist and writer originally from Kita, Tokyo. He graduated from the Social Sciences Department of Waseda University.

Writing

References

External links 

 Music Delivery Memo (Japanese)
 recommuni Podcast (Japanese)
 

Japanese journalists
1973 births
Living people
People from Tokyo
Waseda University alumni
Progressivism in Japan